Alanbrooke Barracks is a military installation at Topcliffe in North Yorkshire, England.

History
The barracks were established, on the site of the former RAF Topcliffe airbase, in 1974, as an ordnance field park. The barracks were named Alanbrooke Barracks after Field Marshal Viscount Alanbrooke, a former Royal Artillery officer, when 1st Regiment Royal Horse Artillery took over the site in 1977. The barracks continued as an artillery base with the arrival of 49 Regiment Royal Artillery in 1982, 27th Regiment Royal Artillery in 1986, 19th Regiment Royal Artillery in 1990, 40th Regiment Royal Artillery in 1998, and 4th Regiment Royal Artillery in 2008.

The barracks were also home to 15th Infantry Brigade from January 1982 to November 1992.

Current units
4th Regiment, Royal Artillery

Future
The barracks are set to close in 2031 under the Future Soldier reforms.

References

Barracks in England
Installations of the British Army